The Deyuanpi Holland Village is a resort in Liouying District, Tainan, Taiwan.

History
The idea of the village establishment was originally proposed by Tainan County Magistrate Su Huan-chih in 2002. The funds for the construction was given by Environmental Protection Administration, Tourism Bureau and Construction and Planning Agency. The village was opened in 2010.

Architecture
The village was constructed with Dutch architecture in the vicinity of Deyuanpi Reservoir. It features dairy products shop,
plaza, pastures and a Dutch windmill.

Facilities
The village is equipped with ferry pier, camping and barbecue ground.

See also
 List of tourist attractions in Taiwan

References

External links
 

2010 establishments in Taiwan
Buildings and structures completed in 2010
Buildings and structures in Tainan
Resorts in Taiwan
Tourist attractions in Tainan